Bank Tejarat Football Club (Bank Tejaret) was an Iranian football club based in Tehran, Iran. It was owned by Bank Tejarat, a state owned bank in Iran. In 1989, Parviz Abutaleb owner of Butan F.C. sold the rights and license of the club to Bank Tejarat. They are famous for launching the career of Iranian football legend Ali Daei. His coach was Amir hajrezaei who was head coach of the Iranian national under 17s team in 1990. From 1991-1994 Godarz Habibi was his assistant. In 1996, Tejarat started in the Tehran league division 1 again and in May, 2001 sold the rights and license of the club.

Managers 
  Nasser Hejazi
  Hassan Rowshan
  Jalal Cheraghpour

References 

Defunct football clubs in Iran
Sport in Tehran
1989 establishments in Iran
Association football clubs established in 1989